

The American Thread Building is a historic building located at 260 West Broadway on the corner of Beach Street in the TriBeCa neighborhood of lower Manhattan, New York City. The eleven story building was designed in the Renaissance Revival style by architect William B. Tubby, and built in 1896. It was originally known as the Wool Exchange Building, and owned by the Wool Warehouse Company. The wool company did not succeed and the building was acquired by the American Thread Company in 1907.  

In 1979 a group of young artist made a stand against real estate developer Harry B. Macklowe.  He emptied a 93% occupied building of its rent paying tenants with the help of the J51 tax abatement offered by then NYC mayor Ed Koch.  It was a lost battle in the New York City courts and the building was renovated and converted into live/work lofts in 1981.

The building was added to the National Register of Historic Places on January 20, 2005.

In 2007, a renovation of one of the units uncovered an early work by artist Keith Haring.

See also
National Register of Historic Places listings in Manhattan below 14th Street

References

External links

Residential buildings on the National Register of Historic Places in Manhattan
Renaissance Revival architecture in New York City
Commercial buildings completed in 1896
Tribeca